Blanche Martin (born January 16, 1937) is a former American football player who played one season with the Los Angeles Chargers and New York Titans. He played college football at Michigan State University.
After retiring from football, Martin practiced as a dentist for more than 40 years. He served on the Michigan State board of trustees from 1969-1985.

References

1937 births
Living people
American football fullbacks
Michigan State Spartans football players
Los Angeles Chargers players
New York Titans (AFL) players
Players of American football from Georgia (U.S. state)